David Lowden is an English former professional rugby league footballer who played in the 1980s and 1990s.

Contemporaneous Article Extract
"David Lowden Full-back/winger. A stand-out player as a full-back for Workington, Lowden emerged as a successful winger as the good times came back to Derwent Park in 1990-91. A product of amateur League in Maryport, has represented Cumbria county at professional level, and was a Halbro Shooting Star winner in the  '88-89 season."

References

External links
Cumbrians too strong for Kumuls…

Living people
Cumbria rugby league team players
English rugby league players
Rugby league fullbacks
Rugby league players from Maryport
Rugby league wingers
Workington Town players
Year of birth missing (living people)